James Carter Pankow is an American trombone player, songwriter and brass instrument arranger, best known as a founding member of the rock band Chicago.

Early life, family and education
Born in St. Louis, Missouri of German and Irish descent, Pankow was one of nine siblings. He is the older brother of actor John Pankow, who appeared on the TV series Mad About You. The family moved to Park Ridge, Illinois when he was eight years old.

Pankow was influenced by his musician father, Wayne. He started playing the trombone at St. Paul of the Cross Elementary School. His Notre Dame High School band instructor was Father George Wiskirchen, CSC.

Pankow earned a full music scholarship to Quincy College, where he studied the bass trombone. After completing his first year, he returned home for the summer and formed a band that began to play some live local shows.  Not wanting to give up this work, Pankow transferred to DePaul University.

He is a member of Phi Mu Alpha Sinfonia, and he was given the National Citation as well as recognition as Signature Sinfonian along with fellow Chicago members and Sinfonians on August 26, 2009.

Career

Chicago
At DePaul, Pankow met Walter Parazaider, who recruited him to join a band, The Big Thing, which would become Chicago Transit Authority. Soon after the first album's release, the band's name was shortened to Chicago. Pankow has remained a member of Chicago since its inception.

In addition to playing the trombone, Pankow has composed many songs for Chicago, including the hits "Make Me Smile" and "Colour My World" (both from his suite Ballet for a Girl in Buchannon), "Just You 'N' Me," "(I've Been) Searchin' So Long," "Old Days," "Alive Again," and (with Peter Cetera) "Feelin' Stronger Every Day."

Pankow has scored most of Chicago's brass arrangements. Although he is not one of the band's principal vocalists, he sang lead vocals for two Chicago songs: "You Are On My Mind" (from Chicago X, 1976) and "Till the End of Time" (Chicago XI, 1977).

Other
Along with fellow Chicago horns Lee Loughnane and Walter Parazaider, Pankow was featured on Three Dog Night's 1969 #15 hit "Celebrate" and on several tracks of the 1979 Bee Gees' Spirits Having Flown album.  Pankow has appeared on several albums for the rock band Toto, including the 1982 Grammy Award-winning Toto IV and their 2006 album Falling in Between, for which he composed the brass arrangements and performed on the song "Dying on My Feet".

Personal life
Pankow and his first wife Karen were married for 18 years. Their children are Jonathan (born 1981) and Sarah (born 1986).

Pankow and his second wife Jeanne Pacelli have two children, Carter (born 1999) and Lilli (born 2002).

References

External links

Chicago official website
2001 interview in the Honolulu Star Bulletin 

Living people
20th-century American male musicians
21st-century American male musicians
21st-century trombonists
20th-century trombonists
American people of German descent
American people of Irish descent
American trombonists
Chicago (band) members
DePaul University alumni
Male trombonists
Musicians from St. Louis
People from Park Ridge, Illinois
Songwriters from Missouri
Year of birth missing (living people)
American male songwriters